Bukit Gombak MRT station is an above-ground Mass Rapid Transit (MRT) station on the North South line in Bukit Batok, Singapore. Located at the junction of Bukit Batok West Avenue 5 and Bukit Batok East Avenue 5, it is the nearest MRT station to the Bukit Batok Town Park, a scenic parkland otherwise known as "Little Guilin".

Opened on 10 March 1990, Bukit Gombak station was part of the Branch line before the opening of the North South line Woodlands Extension on 10 February 1996.

History
Installation of half-height screen doors at the station started on 30 April 2010 and operations commenced on 16 August 2010 with Clementi. Then, this station was installed with high-volume low-speed fans, which commenced operations on 31 October 2012.

Bukit Gombak was a temporary terminus for the North South line from 18 to 19 September 2010 during the Jurong East Modification Project upgrade. and during the late openings of the MRT on Sundays from June to November 2016.

References

External links
 

Railway stations in Singapore opened in 1990
Bukit Batok
Mass Rapid Transit (Singapore) stations